Mahanadi Bridge, Boudh is connecting Kiakata and Boudh. This bridge over river Mahanadi is felicitating communication between Sambalpur, Rairakhol, Kadligarh, Birmaharajpur, and Subalaya with Boudh town. It is the second biggest bridge in Odisha. The work on this bridge was started on 22.04.1998 and completed on 31.12.2002. Length of this bridge is 1858.66m. This bridge carries National Highway 153B

Gallery

External links
 UPSBC

Bridges in Odisha
Bridges completed in 2002
Mahanadi River
Boudh district
2002 establishments in Chhattisgarh